Fort Sumner Municipal Airport  is a village owned, public use airport located two nautical miles (4 km) northeast of the central business district of Fort Sumner, a village in De Baca County, New Mexico, United States. It is included in the National Plan of Integrated Airport Systems for 2011–2015, which categorized it as a general aviation airport.

History 
The airfield's origins date to the 1920s when the Transcontinental Air Transport airline built an airfield in Fort Sumner as part of its coast-to-coast air passenger network, but the site was abandoned when the airline's ambitious plans collapsed in the Great Depression.

The airfield was reopened in February 1941, and was rebuilt in 1942 by the United States Army Air Forces as a World War II training airfield. It was assigned to the AAF Flying Training Command West Coast Training Center and was known as Fort Sumner Army Air Field. The flying cadets at the airfield were trained in advanced twin engine aircraft as phase three of their pilot training. The airfield had at least seven auxiliary landing fields, two of which have been identified:

 Fort Sumner Army Auxiliary Airfield #5 aka Taiban Field/Airport- Taiban 
 Fort Sumner Army Auxiliary Airfield #7 - Tucumcari  
 The Tucumcari facility later became a Prisoner of War Camp in March 1944 as pilot training was phasing down. It is now Tucumcari Municipal Airport.

On August 6, 1944, the airfield was transferred to Second Air Force, where it became a replacement facility for B-17 Flying Fortress and B-24 Liberator crew training.

The facility was inactivated on November 15, 1945 and returned to civil control. It is now a public airport providing general aviation service.

The airport retains the large parking ramp from its training use. Two of the three wartime runways are still in use, the 00/18 runway now abandoned. The cantonment area street pattern still exists, with large numbers of foundations of wartime buildings still in evidence, including the foundations of a large cluster of what were probably the barracks of the POW Camp on the north side of the station.

NASA use 
In the 1980s, the airport was chosen as a launch site for NASA's high-altitude balloon program (see Columbia Scientific Balloon Facility). NASA spent about $100,000 to construct large insulated walls and air conditioning inside the one remaining wartime hangar so payloads could use the place in a controlled environment. Three bays with tall sliding doors that opened into the main hangar area provided a workable area for scientists and their payloads with large steel A-frames used to suspend the payloads. Other NASA buildings were constructed at the airport.

Currently two operational balloon launch campaigns are conducted at the airport each year. These occur in the May–June and September–October timeframe surrounding the two stratospheric turnaround events. The NASA Ft. Sumner facility has grown in capability over the years and now includes a machine shop and still utilizes the old World War II hangar as a work area, storage area for support vehicles, and a hangar for NSBF aircraft during balloon flight operations.

Facilities and aircraft 
Fort Sumner Municipal Airport covers an area of 960 acres (388 ha) at an elevation of 4,165 feet (1,269 m) above mean sea level. It has two asphalt paved runways: 3/21 is 5,802 by 75 feet (1,768 x 23 m) and 8/26 is 5,254 by 60 feet (1,601 x 18 m).

For the 12-month period ending April 9, 2011, the airport had 150 general aviation aircraft operations, an average of 12 per month. At that time there were five aircraft based at this airport: 60% single-engine and 40% multi-engine.

See also 

 New Mexico World War II Army Airfields
 38th Flying Training Wing (World War II)
 List of airports in New Mexico

References 

 
 Shaw, Frederick J. (2004), Locating Air Force Base Sites History’s Legacy, Air Force History and Museums Program, United States Air Force, Washington DC, 2004.
 Scientific Balloon Flight Facility

External links 
 Aerial image as of March 1997 from USGS The National Map
 

Airports in New Mexico
Buildings and structures in De Baca County, New Mexico
Transportation in De Baca County, New Mexico
1941 establishments in New Mexico
Airfields of the United States Army Air Forces in New Mexico
NASA facilities
USAAF Western Flying Training Command
American Theater of World War II